Extra Challenge formerly Extra, Extra is a Philippine television news magazine and reality competition show broadcast by GMA Network. Originally hosted by Karen Davila and Paolo Bediones, it premiered on February 15, 1999 on the network's evening line up as a lifestyle show titled as Extra, Extra. In 2003, it was retitled as Extra Challenge and became a reality show. The show concluded on January 20, 2013.

Overview
On February 15, 1999, Extra Extra premiered as a news magazine show with Paolo Bediones and Karen Davila serving as hosts. Miriam Quiambao replaced Davila as a co-host when she left the show in 2000.

In 2003, it was reformatted as a reality competition show and renamed as Extra Challenge. The show featured celebrities pitted against each other in several challenges. It is patterned after American reality shows such as Survivor, The Amazing Race, America's Next Top Model, Fear Factor, The Simple Life, The Bachelor and The Real Housewives. After Quiambao left in January 2004, Mariel Rodriguez, Phoemela Baranda and Ethel Booba became hosts. In 2006, the show was renamed to Extra Challenge Milyonaryo. Extra Challenge Milyonaryo concluded on May 26, 2006.

In 2012, the show returned as Extra Challenge Extreme with Richard Gutierrez, Marian Rivera and Boobay serving as hosts.

Hosts

 Karen Davila 
 Paolo Bediones 
 Miriam Quiambao 
 Phoemela Baranda 
 Ethel Booba 
 Mariel Rodriguez 
 Richard Gutierrez 
 Marian Rivera 
 Boobay

Ratings
According to AGB Nielsen Philippines' Mega Manila household television ratings, the season premiere of Extra Challenge Extreme on October 27, 2012 earned a 24.6% rating.

Accolades

References

External links
 

1999 Philippine television series debuts
2013 Philippine television series endings
Filipino-language television shows
GMA Network original programming
GMA Integrated News and Public Affairs shows
Philippine reality television series